Oz Vehadar is a Torah institute that deals with the publication of Torah books. It was founded by Rabbi Yosef Samet and currently headed by Rabbi Yehoshua Leifer from Monsey, NY.

Projects 
Oz Vehadar publishes a wide range of Torah books relating to Tanach, Mishnah, Talmud, and works of Rishonim and Acharonim.

Babylonian Talmud 
From 1988 to 2007, Oz Vehadar worked on publishing a new edition of the Babylonian Talmud with corrections of previous texts and an abundance of commentaries. The cost of the project was over $20 million. The project was supported by Jewish businessman and philanthropist Hershey Friedman and thus named "Mahaduras Friedman" after him.

Oz Vehadar also publishes an edition of the Talmud with vowelization and punctuation.

They also published the Mesivta edition of the Talmud, which includes a Hebrew-language translation and commentary, as well as many individual commentaries on the Talmud, including several volumes of Kovetz Mefarshim and the Shita Mekubetzes.

Other publications 

Other Oz Vehadar publications include Talmud Yerushalmi, Tanakh, Hasidic works, Halakhic works, Passover Haggadas, and other books.

Gallery

References

External links
Website
An article on the Oz Vehadar edition, on the torah-box website (in French)

Jewish printing and publishing
Sifrei Kodesh